A farmer is a person who engages in agriculture.

Farmer or farmers may also refer to:

Places

United States
 Farmer, Missouri, an unincorporated community
 Farmer, North Carolina, an unincorporated community
 Farmer, Ohio, an unincorporated community
 Farmer City, Illinois
 Farmer City, Kansas, a ghost town
 Farmer, South Dakota, a town
 Farmer Township, Defiance County, Ohio
 Farmer Township, Rice County, Kansas
 Farmers, Indiana, an unincorporated community
 Farmers, Kentucky, a census-designated place
 Farmers, Ohio, an unincorporated community
 Farmers, Rush County, Indiana, an unincorporated community
 Farmers Township, Fulton County, Illinois

Elsewhere
 Farmer Glacier, Oates Land, Antarctica
 Farmer Island, Queensland, Australia

People
 Farmer (surname), a list of people bearing the surname Farmer
 George Bennett (cricketer, born 1829) (1829–1886), English cricketer
 Farmer Brooks (born 1957), ring name of Canadian retired midget professional wrestler Clifford Fraser
 Farmer Burns (baseball) (1876–?), American baseball pitcher
 Martin Burns (1861–1937), professional wrestler
 Farmer Kelly (1889–1961), American college football player (1911–1914)
 Langford Peel (1831–1867), English gunman in the American Old West
 Farmer Ray (1886–1963), American Major League Baseball pitcher in the 1910 season
 Farmer Steelman (1875–1944), American Major League Baseball catcher
 Farmer Vaughn (1864–1914), American Major League Baseball player
 Farmer Weaver (1865–1943), American Major League Baseball player

Arts, entertainment, and media

Music
 "Farmers", a song by LL Cool J from his 2000 album G.O.A.T.
 The Farmer (opera), a 1787 English comic opera
 The Farmer (song), the debut single of Thin Lizzy

Other uses in arts, entertainment, and media
 The Farmer (film), a 1977 American crime action film
 The Farmer, a South Australian publication, issued from 1933 to 1947, see Yorke Peninsula Country Times
 "The Farmer", a season 3 episode of the television series Haven

Businesses
 Farmer (revenue leasing), pays a lease to a governing power for the right to collect taxes, customs, excise, or other duties. A common practice in the past, but not any more
 Farmers Insurance Group, an insurance carrier in the United States
 Farmers' Mutual Group, former name of FMG Insurance, a mutual insurance company in New Zealand
 Farmers State Bank (disambiguation), various banks in the United States
 Farmers Trading Company, a department store chain in New Zealand

Military
 Mikoyan-Gurevich MiG-19 (NATO reporting name: Farmer), a Soviet fighter aircraft
 Shenyang J-6 (NATO reporting name: Farmer), the Chinese variant of the MiG-19

Political parties
 Farmer (party), a non-existent party occasionally used as a ticket by disgruntled members of the United Farmers in the 1925 and 1930 Canadian federal elections
 Farmers' Party (disambiguation)

Other uses
 Farmer, the defendant in the landmark US Supreme Court case Pollock v. Farmers' Loan & Trust Co.
 Farmer baronets, an extinct title in the Baronetage of Great Britain
 Farmers Classic, the name of the now defunct Los Angeles Open tournament from 2010 to 2012
 Russian Gyroplanes Gyros-1 Farmer, a Russian gyroplane design

See also 
 FAMA, Hong Kong hip hop group
 Farm (disambiguation)

Lists of people by nickname